Temple Beth Israel is a Reform synagogue located at 2090 Hollywood Drive in York, Pennsylvania. Founded in 1877 as the Hebrew Reformed Congregation Temple Beth Israel, it joined the Union of American Hebrew Congregations (now Union for Reform Judaism) in 1907. That year it completed the construction of its first building, a Moorish Revival brick building topped with large, copper Onion domes.

In 1962 Beth Israel started construction on its current facilities, completing the Religious school wing, auditorium, and social facilities, and in 1966 it completed work on the sanctuary. , the rabbi was Jeffrey Astrachan.

External links
 Temple Beth Israel web site
 1907 building

Notes

19th-century synagogues
Buildings and structures in York, Pennsylvania
Moorish Revival architecture in Pennsylvania
Moorish Revival synagogues
Reform synagogues in Pennsylvania
Religious organizations established in 1877
Religious buildings and structures in York County, Pennsylvania
Synagogue buildings with domes
Synagogues completed in 1907
Synagogues completed in 1966
1877 establishments in Pennsylvania